Leora Skolkin-Smith (born 1952 in Manhattan, New York) is an Israeli-American novelist. Her first novel, Edges: O Israel, O Palestine, was selected and edited by Grace Paley for Glad Day Books. Leora Skolkin-Smith graduated (BA and MFA) from Sarah Lawrence College.

Edges: O Israel, O Palestine
Edges: O Israel, O Palestine is set in a pre-1967 Israel, during the Cold War.  Characters are drawn from Israel's long-forgotten past, members of the 1940s Haganah and Jewish underground who find themselves displaced amidst the chaotic and complex tensions of an Israel just beginning to modernize and expand.  Recently awarded a PEN/Faulkner Writers-in-the Schools stipend, EDGES was also picked by "The Bloomsbury Review's 25th Anniversary Issue as a "Favorite Book of the Last 25 Years".  An original audio production of edges narrated by Tovah Feldshuh won an "Earphones Award" from Audiofile Magazine.  EDGES was also a National Women Studies Association Conference Selection and a Jewish Book Council Selection, 2005.

Other accomplishments
 A panelist, on "Israel in Fiction" at the Miami International Book Fair, 2006
 A panelist, on "War in Writing", at the Virginia Festival of the Book, 2006
 A member of the National Book Critics Circle.
 Published in The Washington Post
 Published in The Quarterly Conversation
 Published in The Hamilton Stone Review
 Novel, Edges, developed into Feature Film by Triboro Pictures, retitled "The Fragile Mistress"
 Novel, Hystera,"
 Contributing Editor to Readysteadybook.com
 Cantaraville Three

External links
 www.leoraskolkinsmith.com
 Forum Network interview
 The Fragile Mistress: The film adaptation of Edges.

References

21st-century American novelists
American women novelists
1952 births
Living people
Sarah Lawrence College alumni
People from Manhattan
American people of Israeli descent
21st-century American women writers
20th-century American novelists
20th-century American women writers